"Rainmaker" is the 37th single by English heavy metal band Iron Maiden. It was released on 24 November 2003  as the second and final single from their 13th studio album, Dance of Death (2003). It was written by Dave Murray, Steve Harris and Bruce Dickinson, and produced by Harris and  Kevin Shirley.

Synopsis
The song was largely written by long-time guitarist Dave Murray. The lyrics were inspired by vocalist Bruce Dickinson's comment that the intro riff made him think of raindrops. The song has no connection with the 1995 novel written by John Grisham of the same name.

The guitar solo in "Rainmaker" is played by Dave Murray.

The cover is a still taken from the music video directed by Howard Greenhalgh. This single also contains a double-sided poster.

"More Tea Vicar" is a recording of a jam session (similar to "Pass the Jam") with Bruce Dickinson trying his hand at rapping.

Track listing

CD single
 "Rainmaker" (Dave Murray, Steve Harris, Bruce Dickinson) – 3:48
 "Dance of Death (orchestral version)" (Janick Gers, Harris) – 8:37
 "More Tea Vicar" (Dickinson, Gers, Harris, Nicko McBrain, Murray, Adrian Smith) – 4:37

Japanese CD
 "Rainmaker" (Murray, Harris, Dickinson) – 3:48
 "Dance of Death (orchestral version)" (Gers, Harris) – 8:37
 "More Tea Vicar" (Dickinson, Gers, Harris, McBrain, Murray, Smith) – 4:37
 "The Wicker Man (Live at Brixton Academy, London - 19–21 March 2002)" - 4:38
 "Children of the Damned (Live at Brixton Academy, London - 19–21 March 2002)" - 5:02
Japanese CD Extras:
 "Rainmaker" (Video) - 3:50
 "Wildest Dreams" (Video) - 3:39

Pock iT! Mini CD
 "Rainmaker" (Murray, Harris, Dickinson) – 3:48
 "Dance of Death (orchestral version)" (Gers, Harris) – 8:37

7" Vinyl
 "Rainmaker" (Murray, Harris, Dickinson) – 3:48
 "Dance of Death (orchestral version)" (Gers, Harris) – 8:37

DVD
 "Rainmaker" (video) (Murray, Harris, Dickinson) – 3:48
 "The Wicker Man (Live at Brixton Academy, London - 19–21 March 2002)" (Smith, Harris, Dickinson) - 4:35
 "Children of the Damned (Live at Brixton Academy, London - 19–21 March 2002)" (Harris) - 5:03
 "Rainmaker Video – The Making Of"

Personnel
Production credits are adapted from the CD, DVD, and picture disc covers.
Iron Maiden
Bruce Dickinson – lead vocals
Dave Murray – lead guitar
Janick Gers – rhythm guitar
Adrian Smith – rhythm guitar
Steve Harris – bass guitar, co-producer
Nicko McBrain – drums
Production
Kevin Shirley – producer, engineer, mixing (except "The Wicker Man")
Doug Hall – producer, mixing ("The Wicker Man")
Howard Greenhalgh – music video director
Lawrence Watson – photography

Chart performance

References

2003 singles
Iron Maiden songs
Music videos directed by Howard Greenhalgh
Song recordings produced by Kevin Shirley
Songs written by Bruce Dickinson
Songs written by Steve Harris (musician)